Izabela Czartoryska can refer to three Polish noble ladies of that surname:
 Princess Izabela Elżbieta Czartoryska (née Countess Morsztyn) (1671–1756) 
 Princess Izabela Czartoryska (née Countess Fleming) (1746–1835) 
 Princess Izabella Elżbieta Czartoryska (1832–1899)